A Quiet Little Wedding is a 1913 American short comedy film featuring Fatty Arbuckle.

Cast
 Roscoe 'Fatty' Arbuckle
 Charles Avery
 Alice Davenport
 Minta Durfee
 Billy Gilbert
 Edgar Kennedy
 Al St. John

See also
 List of American films of 1913
 Fatty Arbuckle filmography

External links

1913 films
1913 comedy films
1913 short films
American silent short films
American black-and-white films
Films directed by Wilfred Lucas
Films directed by Mack Sennett
Silent American comedy films
American comedy short films
1910s American films